Manong is a state constituency in Perak, Malaysia, that has been represented in the Perak State Legislative Assembly from 1974 to 1986, from 1995 to present.

The state constituency was created in the 1974 redistribution and is mandated to return a single member to the Perak State Legislative Assembly under the first past the post voting system.

Demographics

History
It was abolished in 1986 when it was redistributed. It was re-created in 1994.

2004–2016: The constituency contains the polling districts of Taman Bunga Raya, Talang Hulu, Jalan Baharu, Bendang Panjang, Jerlun, Kampong Mesjid, Kampong Ketior, Ulu Kenas, Lempor, Kampong Jeliang, Manong, Kampong Semat, Ulu Piol.

2016–present: The constituency contains the polling districts of Taman Bunga Raya, Talang Hulu, Jalan Baharu, Bendang Panjang, Jerlun, Kampong Mesjid, Kampong Ketior, Ulu Kenas, Lempor, Kampong Jeliang, Manong, Kampong Semat, Ulu Piol.

Polling districts
According to the federal gazette issued on 31 October 2022, the Manong constituency is divided into 13 polling districts.

Representation history

Election results

References

Perak state constituencies